Gráinne Murphy (born 26 March 1993) is an Irish swimmer representing Ireland at international level. She qualified for the 2012 Summer Olympics in London, though due to illness only swam the heats of the 400m Freestyle. She was forced to withdraw from the rest of the meet, including her focus event (the 800m Freestyle), where she would have been in contention for a place in the final.

Career
Murphy hails from Ballinaboola, New Ross, County Wexford. An accomplished junior athlete, she won three gold medals and one bronze at the 2009 European Junior Swimming Championships and was awarded Texaco Young Sportstar Award 2009.

Murphy has also been successful at senior level, winning a silver medal in the 1,500 metres Freestyle at the 2010 European Aquatics Championships, ahead of Erika Villaécija García and behind '09 World Championship Silver Medallist, Lotte Friis. She is also the current holder of the Irish record for that event.

Murphy then competed in the 2010 European Short Course Swimming Championships in Eindhoven. She took bronze in 400 m freestyle behind Melanie Costa and Ágnes Mutina. She also claimed bronze in the 800 m freestyle, behind Federica Pellegrini and Boglárka Kapás. She was shortlisted for RTÉ Sports Person of the Year in 2010.

On 3 December 2011, she qualified for the 2012 Summer Olympics in London. However, on 31 July 2012, after swimming in the heats of the 400m freestyle, she revealed that she had been suffering from glandular fever and it forced her to withdraw from the rest of the competition.  She had been a contender to make the final of her favoured event, the 800m freestyle, and had withdrawn from the 200m Freestyle earlier in the meet to conserve her health and energy for that race.

Prior to London 2012 she was based at the High Performance centre at the University of Limerick.  However, in the aftermath of the games she has returned to her hometown of New Ross, County Wexford to continue her training after her coach Ronald Claes was fired from his post of High Performance Coach.

See also
 Gráinne (given name)

References

1993 births
Living people
Alumni of the University of Limerick
European Aquatics Championships medalists in swimming
Irish female swimmers
Olympic swimmers of Ireland
People educated at Castletroy College
People from New Ross
Swimmers at the 2012 Summer Olympics
21st-century Irish women